Tritoniopsis is the scientific name of two genera of organisms and may refer to:

Tritoniopsis (gastropod), a genus of molluscs in the family  	Tritoniidae
Tritoniopsis (plant), a genus of plants in the family Iridaceae